Lars Anders Jansson, (born 9 October 1967 in Staffanstorp), is a Swedish comedian known for such TV-shows as Hipp Hipp and the Swedish version of QI.

Jansson, as well as his close companion Johan Wester, started out his entertaining career doing student horseplay at Lund University.

Jansson, again with Wester, worked as scriptwriter for the TV-show Snacka om nyheter (Have I Got News For You). Jansson has also done voice-over for Pixar movies Finding Nemo (Bruce) and Brother Bear (Rutt).

In 2010, he did the part of Sir Bedevere in the Swedish production of Spamalot at Nöjesteatern in Malmö. In the fall of 2012 SVT started airing Intresseklubben, a Swedish version of the BBC-show QI, where Jansson took on the Alan Davies-role of regular panellist.

Jansson hosted Melodifestivalen 2014 along with Nour El-Refai.

References

External links 

Anagram productions (in Swedish)

Swedish comedians
1967 births
Living people
People from Staffanstorp Municipality